Muhammad Shahid (born on 10 November 1984), is a Pakistani footballer, who plays as a centre-back for Khan Research Laboratories. He has also played for Pakistan from 2005 to 2008, making 11 appearances for the country. He is the most successful player in history of Pakistani football, winning a record twelve trophies in his career which includes a record seven Pakistan Premier League titles and five National Football Challenge Cups.

He earned his first international cap during the 2005 Indo-Pak series. He has won the Pakistan Premier League for a record seven times, winning three titles with WAPDA in 2004–05, 2007–08 and 2008–09, and four times with Khan Research Laboratories in 2011–12, 2012–13, 2013–14 and 2018–19. He has also won National Football Challenge Cup five times with Khan Research Laboratories, winning the domestic cup in 2010, 2011, 2012, 2015 and 2016

Honours

WAPDA
Pakistan Premier League: 2004–05, 2007–08, 2008–09

Khan Research Laboratories
Pakistan Premier League: 2011–12, 2012–13, 2013–14, 2018–19
National Football Challenge Cup: 2010, 2011, 2012, 2015, 2016

References

1985 births
Living people
Pakistani footballers
Pakistan international footballers
WAPDA F.C. players
Khan Research Laboratories F.C. players

Association football central defenders